Nccc (or NCCC) may refer to:
 National Civilian Community Corps, a program of AmeriCorps that uses youth aged 18-24 with military connections to complete national and community projects
 National COVID-19 Coordination Commission, renamed National COVID-19 Commission Advisory Board (NCC), Australian Government board
 Neosho County Community College
 New City Commercial Corporation Malls (NCCC Malls)
 New Creation Christian Community
 Niagara County Community College
 Nordic Chinese Christian Church
 North Country Community College
 Northwestern Connecticut Community College
 Northamptonshire County Cricket Club
 Nottinghamshire County Cricket Club
 United States Nuclear command, control, and communications